Stygobromus bowmani, commonly called Bowman's cave amphipod, is a troglomorphic species of amphipod in family Crangonyctidae. It is endemic to Oklahoma in the United States.

References

Freshwater crustaceans of North America
Crustaceans described in 1967
Cave crustaceans
Endemic fauna of Oklahoma
bowmani